Fuchsine (sometimes spelled fuchsin) or rosaniline hydrochloride is a magenta dye with chemical formula C20H19N3·HCl. There are other similar chemical formulations of products sold as fuchsine, and several dozen other synonyms of this molecule.

It becomes magenta when dissolved in water; as a solid, it forms dark green crystals. As well as dying textiles, fuchsine is used to stain bacteria and sometimes as a disinfectant. In the literature of biological stains the name of this dye is frequently misspelled, with omission of the terminal -e, which indicates an amine. American and English dictionaries (Webster's, Oxford, Chambers, etc.) give the correct spelling, which is also used in the literature of industrial dyeing. It is well established that production of fuchsine results in development of bladder cancers by production workers. Production of magenta is listed as a circumstance known to result in cancer.

History

Fuchsine was first created by Jakub Natanson in 1856 from aniline and 1,2-Dichloroethane. In 1858 August Wilhelm von Hofmann obtained it from aniline and carbon tetrachloride.  discovered the substance independently of Hofmann the same year and patented it. Fuchsine was named by its original manufacturer Renard frères et Franc, is usually cited with one of two etymologies: from the color of the flowers of the plant genus Fuchsia, named in honor of botanist Leonhart Fuchs, or as the German translation Fuchs of the French name Renard, which means fox. An 1861 article in Répertoire de Pharmacie said that the name was chosen for both reasons.

Acid fuchsine
Acid fuchsine is a mixture of homologues of basic fuchsine, modified by addition of sulfonic groups. While this yields twelve possible isomers, all of them are satisfactory despite slight differences in their properties.

Basic fuchsine
Basic fuchsine is a mixture of rosaniline, pararosaniline, new fuchsine and Magenta II. Formulations usable for making of Schiff reagent must have high content of pararosanilin. The actual composition of basic fuchsine tends to somewhat vary by vendor and batch, making the batches differently suitable for different purposes.

In solution with phenol (also called carbolic acid) as an accentuator it is called carbol fuchsin and is used for the Ziehl–Neelsen and other similar acid-fast staining of the mycobacteria which cause tuberculosis, leprosy etc. Basic fuchsine is widely used in biology to stain the nucleus, and is also a component of Lactofuchsin, used for Lactofuchsin mounting.

Properties

The crystals pictured at the right are of basic fuchsine, also known as basic violet 14, basic red 9, pararosanaline or CI 42500. Their structure differs from the structure shown above by the absence of the methyl group on the upper ring, otherwise they are quite similar.

They are soft, with a hardness of less than 1, about the same as or less than talc. They possess a strong metallic lustre and a green yellow color. They leave dark greenish streaks on paper and when these are moistened with a solvent, the strong magenta colour appears.

Chemical structure
Fuchsine is an amine salt and has three amine groups, two primary amines and a secondary amine. If one of these is protonated to form ABCNH+, the positive charge is delocalized across the whole symmetrical molecule due to pi cloud electron movement.

The positive charge can be thought of as residing on the central carbon atom and all three "wings" becoming identical aromatic rings terminated by a primary amine group. Other resonance structures can be conceived, where the positive charge "moves" from one amine group to the next, or one third of the positive charge resides on each amine group. The ability of fuchsine to be protonated by a stronger acid  gives it its basic property. The positive charge is neutralized by the negative charge on the chloride ion. The positive "basic fuchsinium ions" and negative chloride ions stack to form the salt "crystals" depicted above.

See also
 New fuchsine and Acid fuchsine are related dyes
 Fuchsine is a component in the Schiff test
 Fuchsine is now often used in the Gram stain procedure in microbiology.
 Basic Fuchsine is a component in the Lactofuchsin mount

References

Further reading
  This provides a detailed account of early experimentation on related chemicals.

Triarylmethane dyes
Staining dyes
Anilines
Disinfectants
IARC Group 2B carcinogens